This article displays the qualifying draw of the 2011 Brussels Open.

Players

Seeds

Qualifiers

Lucky losers
  Irina Falconi

Qualifying draw

First qualifier

Second qualifier

Third qualifier

Fourth qualifier

References
 Qualifying Draw

2011 - qualifying
Brussels Open - qualifying